Julio Alsogaray (born 11 April 1980 in San Pedro, Buenos Aires Province) is an Argentine sailor in the Optimist, Laser, Lightning and Snipe classes. 

Worlds. Gold at the 2019 Lightning Worlds, silver at the 2008 Laser Worlds, and bronze at the 1994 Optimist Worlds.
Olympic Games. At the 2008 Summer Olympics in Beijing he finished seventh, while at the 2012 Summer Olympics he finished 11th, and at the 2020 Summer Olympics he finished tenth. 
Central and South American Laser Championship 2012

References

External links
 
 

1980 births
Living people
Argentine male sailors (sport)
Snipe class sailors
Olympic sailors of Argentina
Sailors at the 2008 Summer Olympics – Laser
Sailors at the 2012 Summer Olympics – Laser
Pan American Games gold medalists for Argentina
Pan American Games bronze medalists for Argentina
Sailors at the 2007 Pan American Games
Sailors at the 2011 Pan American Games
Sportspeople from Buenos Aires Province
Sailors at the 2016 Summer Olympics – Laser
Pan American Games medalists in sailing
Sailors at the 2015 Pan American Games
South American Games gold medalists for Argentina
South American Games medalists in sailing
Competitors at the 2010 South American Games
Medalists at the 2007 Pan American Games
Medalists at the 2011 Pan American Games